Harkstead is a village and civil parish in the county of Suffolk, England. It is part of Babergh local government district.

Most of the civil parish south of the road between the nearby villages of Lower Holbrook and Erwarton lies within the Suffolk Coast and Heaths Area of Outstanding Natural Beauty. The civil parish is bounded by the neighbouring civil parishes of Holbrook, Chelmondiston and Arwarton. Large areas of the civil parish are classified as Scheduled Monuments due to the presence of ring ditches, post-medieval field boundaries and later prehistoric or Roman field systems.

References

External links

Village website run by Parish Council
Village website

Villages in Suffolk
Babergh District
Civil parishes in Suffolk